Salmon Creek may refer to:

Streams in the United States
 Salmon Creek (Sonoma County, California)
 Salmon Creek (Housatonic River), a tributary of the Housatonic River in Connecticut
 Little Salmon River (Lake Ontario), Oswego County, New York
 Salmon Creek (Cayuga Lake), Tompkins County, New York
 Salmon Creek (Clark County, Washington)
 Salmon Creek (Black River tributary), Thurston County, Washington
 Salmon Creek (Skookumchuck River tributary), Thurston County, Washington

Inhabited places
 Salmon Creek, California
 Salmon Creek, California, the former name of Beatrice, Humboldt County, California
 Salmon Creek, Washington

Other
 Salmon Creek Middle School, in Occidental, California

See also
 Big Salmon Creek (California), a stream in Mendocino County
 Little Salmon Creek (Mendocino County), a stream in California
 Salmon Branch, a creek in Tennessee
 
 Salmon River (disambiguation)